A circus is a company of performers who put on diverse entertainment shows that may include clowns, acrobats, trained animals, trapeze acts, musicians, dancers, hoopers, tightrope walkers, jugglers, magicians, ventriloquists, and unicyclists as well as other object manipulation and stunt-oriented artists. The term circus also describes the performance which has followed various formats through its 250-year modern history. Although not the inventor of the medium, Philip Astley is credited as the father of the modern circus. In 1768, Astley, a skilled equestrian, began performing exhibitions of trick horse riding in an open field called Ha'Penny Hatch on the south side of the Thames River, England. In 1770, he hired acrobats, tightrope walkers, jugglers and a clown to fill in the pauses between the equestrian demonstrations and thus chanced on the format which was later named a "circus". Performances developed significantly over the next fifty years, with large-scale theatrical battle reenactments becoming a significant feature. The traditional format, in which a ringmaster introduces a variety of choreographed acts set to music, developed in the latter part of the 19th century and remained the dominant format until the 1970s.

As styles of performance have developed since the time of Astley, so too have the types of venues where these circuses have performed. The earliest modern circuses were performed in open-air structures with limited covered seating. From the late 18th to late 19th century, custom-made circus buildings (often wooden) were built with various types of seating, a centre ring, and sometimes a stage. The traditional large tents commonly known as "big tops" were introduced in the mid-19th century as touring circuses superseded static venues. These tents eventually became the most common venue. Contemporary circuses perform in a variety of venues including tents, theatres and casinos. Many circus performances are still held in a ring, usually  in diameter. This dimension was adopted by Astley in the late 18th century as the minimum diameter that enabled an acrobatic horse rider to stand upright on a cantering horse to perform their tricks.

Contemporary circus has been credited with a revival of the circus tradition since the late 1970s, when a number of groups began to experiment with new circus formats and aesthetics, typically avoiding the use of animals to focus exclusively on human artistry. Circuses within the movement have tended to favour a theatrical approach, combining character-driven circus acts with original music in a broad variety of styles to convey complex themes or stories. Contemporary circus continues to develop new variations on the circus tradition while absorbing new skills, techniques, and stylistic influences from other performing arts.

Etymology
First attested in English 14th century, the word circus derives from Latin , which is the romanization of the Greek , itself a metathesis of the Homeric Greek , meaning "circle" or "ring". In the book  early Christian writer Tertullian claimed that the first circus games were staged by the goddess Circe in honour of her father Helios, the Sun God.

History

The modern and commonly held idea of a circus is of a Big Top with various acts providing entertainment therein; however, the history of circuses is more complex, with historians disagreeing on its origin, as well as revisions being done about the history due to the changing nature of historical research, and the ongoing circus phenomenon. For many, circus history begins with Englishman Philip Astley, while for others its origins go back much further—to Roman times.

Origin
In Ancient Rome, the circus was a roofless arena for the exhibition of horse and chariot races, equestrian shows, staged battles, gladiatorial combat, and displays of (and fights with) trained animals. The circuses of Rome were similar to the ancient Greek hippodromes, although circuses served varying purposes and differed in design and construction, and for events that involved re-enactments of naval battles, the circus was flooded with water; however, the Roman circus buildings were not circular but rectangular with semi circular ends. The lower seats were reserved for persons of rank; there were also various state boxes for the giver of the games and his friends. The circus was the only public spectacle at which men and women were not separated.  Some circus historians such as George Speaight have stated "these performances may have taken place in the great arenas that were called 'circuses' by the Romans, but it is a mistake to equate these places, or the entertainments presented there, with the modern circus". Others have argued that the lineage of the circus does go back to the Roman circuses and a chronology of circus-related entertainment can be traced to Roman times, continued by the Hippodrome of Constantinople that operated until the 13th century, through medieval and renaissance jesters, minstrels and troubadours to the late 18th century and the time of Astley.

The first circus in the city of Rome was the Circus Maximus, in the valley between the Palatine and Aventine hills. It was constructed during the monarchy and, at first, built completely from wood. After being rebuilt several times, the final version of the Circus Maximus could seat 250,000 people; it was built of stone and measured 400m in length and 90m in width. Next in importance were the Circus Flaminius and the Circus Neronis, from the notoriety which it obtained through the Circensian pleasures of Nero. A fourth circus was constructed by Maxentius; its ruins have helped archaeologists reconstruct the Roman circus.

For some time after the fall of Rome, large circus buildings fell out of use as centres of mass entertainment. Instead, itinerant performers, animal trainers, and showmen travelled between towns throughout Europe, performing at local fairs such as the Bartholomew Fair in London during the Middle Ages.

Modern format

Astley and early British circus

The origin of the modern circus has been attributed to Philip Astley, who was born 1742 in Newcastle-under-Lyme, England. He became a cavalry officer who set up the first modern amphitheatre for the display of horse riding tricks in Lambeth, London, on 4 April 1768. Astley did not originate trick horse riding, nor was he first to introduce acts such as acrobats and clowns to the English public, but he was the first to create a space where all these acts were brought together to perform a show. Astley rode in a circle rather than a straight line as his rivals did, and thus chanced on the format of performing in a circle. Astley performed stunts in a 42 ft diameter ring, which is the standard size used by circuses ever since. Astley referred to the performance arena as a circle and the building as an amphitheatre; these would later be known as a circus. In 1770, Astley hired acrobats, tightrope walkers, jugglers, and a clown to fill in the pauses between acts.

Astley was followed by Andrew Ducrow, whose feats of horsemanship had much to do with establishing the traditions of the circus, which were perpetuated by Hengler's and Sanger's celebrated shows in a later generation. In England circuses were often held in purpose-built buildings in large cities, such as the London Hippodrome, which was built as a combination of the circus, the menagerie, and the variety theatre, where wild animals such as lions and elephants from time to time appeared in the ring, and where convulsions of nature such as floods, earthquakes, and volcanic eruptions were produced with an extraordinary wealth of realistic display. Joseph Grimaldi, the first mainstream clown, had his first major role as Little Clown in the pantomime The Triumph of Mirth; or, Harlequin's Wedding in 1781. The Royal Circus was opened in London on 4 November 1782 by Charles Dibdin (who coined the term "circus"), aided by his partner Charles Hughes, an equestrian performer. In 1782, Astley established the Amphithéâtre Anglais in Paris, the first purpose-built circus in France, followed by 18 other permanent circuses in cities throughout Europe. Astley leased his Parisian circus to the Italian Antonio Franconi in 1793. In 1826, the first circus took place under a canvas big top.

Ricketts and the first American circus
The Englishman John Bill Ricketts brought the first modern circus to the United States. He began his theatrical career with Hughes Royal Circus in London in the 1780s, and travelled from England in 1792 to establish his first circus in Philadelphia. The first circus building in the US opened on 3 April 1793 in Philadelphia, where Ricketts gave America's first complete circus performance. George Washington attended a performance there later that season.

Expansion of the American format
In the Americas during the first two decades of the 19th century, the Circus of Pepin and Breschard toured from Montreal to Havana, building circus theatres in many of the cities it visited. Victor Pépin, a native New Yorker, was the first American to operate a major circus in the United States. Later the establishments of Purdy, Welch & Co., and of van Amburgh gave a wider popularity to the circus in the United States. In 1825, Joshuah Purdy Brown was the first circus owner to use a large canvas tent for the circus performance. Circus pioneer Dan Rice was the most famous pre-Civil War circus clown, popularizing such expressions as "The One-Horse Show" and "Hey, Rube!". The American circus was revolutionized by P. T. Barnum and William Cameron Coup, who launched the travelling P. T. Barnum's Museum, Menagerie & Circus, the first freak show, in the 1870s. Coup also introduced the first multiple-ring circuses, and was also the first circus entrepreneur to use circus trains to transport the circus between towns. By the 1830s, sideshows were also being established alongside travelling circuses.

Touring 
In 1838, the equestrian Thomas Taplin Cooke returned to England from the United States, bringing with him a circus tent. At this time, itinerant circuses that could be fitted-up quickly were becoming popular in Britain. William Batty's circus, for example, between 1838 and 1840, travelled from Newcastle to Edinburgh and then to Portsmouth and Southampton. Pablo Fanque, who is noteworthy as Britain's only black circus proprietor and who operated one of the most celebrated travelling circuses in Victorian England, erected temporary structures for his limited engagements or retrofitted existing structures. One such structure in Leeds, which Fanque assumed from a departing circus, collapsed, resulting in minor injuries to many but the death of Fanque's wife. Traveling circus companies also rented the land they set up their structures on sometimes causing damage to the local ecosystems. Three important circus innovators were the Italian Giuseppe Chiarini, and Frenchmen Louis Soullier and Jacques Tourniaire, whose early travelling circuses introduced the circus to Latin America, Australia, Southeast Asia, China, South Africa, and Russia. Soullier was the first circus owner to introduce Chinese acrobatics to the European circus when he returned from his travels in 1866, and Tourniaire was the first to introduce the performing art to Ranga, where it became extremely popular.

After an 1881 merger with James Anthony Bailey and James L. Hutchinson's circus and Barnum's death in 1891, his circus travelled to Europe as the Barnum & Bailey Greatest Show On Earth, where it toured from 1897 to 1902, impressing other circus owners with its large scale, its touring techniques (including the tent and circus train), and its combination of circus acts, a zoological exhibition, and a freak show. This format was adopted by European circuses at the turn of the 20th century.

The influence of the American circus brought about a considerable change in the character of the modern circus. In arenas too large for speech to be easily audible, the traditional comic dialogue of the clown assumed a less prominent place than formerly, while the vastly increased wealth of stage properties relegated to the background the old-fashioned equestrian feats, which were replaced by more ambitious acrobatic performances, and by exhibitions of skill, strength, and daring, requiring the employment of immense numbers of performers, and often of complicated and expensive machinery.

From the late 19th century through the first half of the 20th century, travelling circuses were a major form of spectator entertainment in the US and attracted huge attention whenever they arrived in a city. After World War II, the popularity of the circus declined as new forms of entertainment (such as television) arrived and the public's tastes changed. From the 1960s onward, circuses attracted growing criticism from animal rights activists. Many circuses went out of business or were forced to merge with other circus companies. Nonetheless, a good number of travelling circuses are still active in various parts of the world, ranging from small family enterprises to three-ring extravaganzas. Other companies found new ways to draw in the public with innovative new approaches to the circus form itself.

Russia
In 1919, Lenin, head of Soviet Russia, expressed a wish for the circus to become "the people's art-form", with facilities and status on par with theatre, opera and ballet. The USSR nationalized Russian circuses. In 1927, the State University of Circus and Variety Arts, better known as the Moscow Circus School, was established; performers were trained using methods developed from the Soviet gymnastics program. When the Moscow State Circus company began international tours in the 1950s, its levels of originality and artistic skill were widely applauded.

China
Circuses from China, drawing on Chinese traditions of acrobatics, like the Chinese State Circus are also popular touring acts.

Contemporary circus

Contemporary circus (originally known as cirque nouveau) is a performing arts movement that originated in the 1970s in Australia, Canada, France, the West Coast of the United States, and the United Kingdom. Contemporary circus combines traditional circus skills and theatrical techniques to convey a story or theme. Compared with the traditional circus, the contemporary genre of circus tends to focus more attention on the overall aesthetic impact, on character and story development, and on the use of lighting design, original music, and costume design to convey thematic or narrative content. For aesthetic or economic reasons, contemporary circus productions may sometimes be staged in theatres rather than in large outdoor tents. Music used in the production is often composed exclusively for that production, and aesthetic influences are drawn as much from contemporary culture as from circus history. Animal acts rarely appear in contemporary circus, in contrast to traditional circus, where animal acts have often been a significant part of the entertainment.

Early pioneers of the contemporary circus genre included: Circus Oz, forged in Australia in 1977 from SoapBox Circus (1976) and New Circus (1973); the Pickle Family Circus, founded in San Francisco in 1975; Ra-Ra Zoo in 1984 in London; Nofit State Circus in 1984 from Wales; Cirque du Soleil, founded in Quebec in 1984; Cirque Plume and Archaos from France in 1984 and 1986 respectively. More recent examples include: Cirque Éloize (founded in Quebec in 1993); Sweden's Cirkus Cirkör (1995); Teatro ZinZanni (founded in Seattle in 1998); the West African Circus Baobab (late 1990s); and Montreal's Les 7 doigts de la main (founded in 2002). The genre includes other circus troupes such as the Vermont-based Circus Smirkus (founded in 1987 by Rob Mermin) and Le Cirque Imaginaire (later renamed Le Cirque Invisible, both founded and directed by Victoria Chaplin, daughter of Charlie Chaplin).

The most conspicuous success story in the contemporary genre has been that of Cirque du Soleil, the Canadian circus company whose estimated annual revenue exceeds US$810 million in 2009, and whose cirque nouveau shows have been seen by nearly 90 million spectators in over 200 cities on five continents.

Performance

A traditional circus performance is often led by a ringmaster who has a role similar to a Master of Ceremonies. The ringmaster presents performers, speaks to the audience, and generally keeps the show moving. The activity of the circus traditionally takes place within a ring; large circuses may have multiple rings, like the six-ringed Moscow State Circus. A circus often travels with its own band, whose instrumentation in the United States has traditionally included brass instruments, drums, glockenspiel, and sometimes the distinctive sound of the calliope.

Acts

Common acts include a variety of acrobatics, gymnastics (including tumbling and trampoline), aerial acts (such as trapeze, aerial silk, corde lisse), contortion, stilt-walking, and a variety of other routines. Juggling is one of the most common acts in a circus; the combination of juggling and gymnastics is called equilibristics and includes acts like plate spinning and the rolling globe. Acts like these are some of the most common and the most traditional. Clowns are common to most circuses and are typically skilled in many circus acts; "clowns getting into the act" is a very familiar theme in any circus. Famous circus clowns have included Austin Miles, the Fratellini Family, Rusty Russell, Emmett Kelly, Grock, and Bill Irwin.

Daredevil stunt acts, freak shows, and sideshow acts are also parts of some circus acts, these activities may include human cannonball, chapeaugraphy, fire eating, breathing, and dancing, knife throwing, magic shows, sword swallowing, or strongman. Famous sideshow performers include Zip the Pinhead and The Doll Family. A popular sideshow attraction from the early 19th century was the flea circus, where fleas were attached to props and viewed through a Fresnel lens.

Animal acts

A variety of animals have historically been used in acts. While the types of animals used vary from circus to circus, big cats (namely lions, tigers, and leopards), foxes, wolves, polecats, minks, weasels, camels, llamas, elephants, zebras, horses, donkeys, birds (like parrots, doves, and cockatoos), sea lions, bears, monkeys, and domestic animals such as cats and dogs are the most common.

The earliest involvement of animals in circus was just the display of exotic creatures in a menagerie. Going as far back as the early eighteenth century, exotic animals were transported to North America for display, and menageries were a popular form of entertainment. The first true animals acts in the circus were equestrian acts. Soon elephants and big cats were displayed as well. Isaac A. Van Amburgh entered a cage with several big cats in 1833, and is generally considered to be the first wild animal trainer in American circus history. Mabel Stark was a famous female tiger-tamer.

Controversy and laws

Animal rights groups have documented many cases of animal cruelty in the training of performing circus animals. The animal rights group People for the Ethical Treatment of Animals (PETA) contends that animals in circuses are frequently beaten into submission and that physical abuse has always been the method for training circus animals. It is also alleged that the animals are kept in cages that are too small and are given very little opportunity to walk around outside of their enclosure, thereby violating their right to freedom.

United States
According to PETA, although the US Animal Welfare Act does not permit any sort of punishment that puts the animals in discomfort, trainers will still go against this law and use such things as electric rods and bullhooks. According to PETA, during an undercover investigation of Carson & Barnes Circus, video footage was captured showing animal care director Tim Frisco training endangered Asian elephants with electrical shock prods and instructing other trainers to "beat the elephants with a bullhook as hard as they can and sink the sharp metal hook into the elephant's flesh and twist it until they scream in pain".

On behalf of the Ministry of Agriculture, Nature and Food Quality of the Netherlands, Wageningen University conducted an investigation into the welfare of circus animals in 2008. The following issues, among others, were found:

 71% of the observed animals had medical problems.
 33% of tigers and lions did not have access to an outdoor enclosure.
 Lions spend on average 98% of their time indoors.
 An average enclosure for tigers is only 5 m2.
 Elephants are shackled in chains for 17 hours a day on average.
 Elephants spend on average 10 hours a day showing stereotypic behaviour.
 Tigers are terrified of fire but are still forced to jump through fire rings.
 Since 1990 there have been over 123 cases of lion attacks at circuses.
 Animals are trained through discipline.

Based on these findings, the researchers called for more stringent regulation regarding the welfare of circus animals. In 2012, the Dutch government announced a ban on the use of wild circus animals.

In testimony in U.S. District Court in 2009, Ringling Bros. and Barnum & Bailey Circus CEO Kenneth Feld acknowledged that circus elephants are struck behind the ears, under the chin and on their legs with metal tipped prods, called bullhooks. Feld stated that these practices are necessary to protect circus workers. Feld also acknowledged that an elephant trainer was reprimanded for using an electric shock device, known as a hot shot or electric prod, on an elephant, which Feld also stated was appropriate practice. Feld denied that any of these practices harm elephants. In its January 2010 verdict on the case, brought against Feld Entertainment International by the American Society for the Prevention of Cruelty to Animals et al., the Court ruled that evidence against the circus company was "not credible with regard to the allegations". In lieu of a USDA hearing, Feld Entertainment Inc. (parent of Ringling Bros.) agreed to pay an unprecedented $270,000 fine for violations of the Animal Welfare Act that allegedly occurred between June 2007 and August 2011.

A 14-year litigation against the Ringling Bros. and Barnum & Bailey Circus came to an end in 2014 when The Humane Society of the United States and a number of other animal rights groups paid a $16 million settlement to Feld Entertainment; however, the circus closed in May 2017 after a 146-year run when it experienced a steep decline in ticket sales a year after it discontinued its elephant act and sent its pachyderms to a reserve.

On 1 February 1992 at the Great American Circus in Palm Bay, Florida, an elephant named Janet (1965 – 1 February 1992) went out of control while giving a ride to a mother, her two children, and three other children. The elephant then stampeded through the circus grounds outside before being shot to death by police. Also, during a Circus International performance in Honolulu, Hawaii, on 20 August 1994, an elephant called Tyke (1974 – 20 August 1994) killed her trainer, Allen Campbell, and severely mauled her groomer, Dallas Beckwith, in front of hundreds of spectators. Tyke then bolted from the arena and ran through the streets of Kakaako for more than thirty minutes. Police fired 86 shots at Tyke, who eventually collapsed from the wounds and died.

In December 2018, New Jersey became the first state in the U.S. to ban circuses, carnivals and fairs from featuring elephants, tigers, and other exotic animals.

England
In 1998 in the United Kingdom, a parliamentary working group chaired by MP Roger Gale studied living conditions and treatment of animals in UK circuses. All members of this group agreed that a change in the law was needed to protect circus animals. Gale told the BBC, "It's undignified and the conditions under which they are kept are woefully inadequate—the cages are too small, the environments they live in are not suitable and many of us believe the time has come for that practice to end." The group reported concerns about boredom and stress, and noted that an independent study by a member of the Wildlife Conservation Research Unit at Oxford University "found no evidence that circuses contribute to education or conservation."; however, in 2007, a different working group under the UK Department for Environment, Food and Rural Affairs, having reviewed information from experts representing both the circus industry and animal welfare, found an absence of "scientific evidence sufficient to demonstrate that travelling circuses are not compatible with meeting the welfare needs of any type of non-domesticated animal presently being used in the United Kingdom." According to that group's report, published in October 2007, "there appears to be little evidence to demonstrate that the welfare of animals kept in travelling circuses is any better or any worse than that of animals kept in other captive environments."

A ban prohibiting the use of wild animals in circuses in England was due to be passed in 2015, but Conservative MP Christopher Chope repeatedly blocked the bill under the reasoning that "The EU Membership Costs and Benefits bill should have been called by the clerk before the circuses bill, so I raised a point of order". He explained that the circus bill was "at the bottom of the list" for discussion. The Animal Defenders International non-profit group dubbed this "a huge embarrassment for Britain that 30 other nations have taken action before us on this simple and popular measure". On 1 May 2019 Environmental Secretary Michael Gove announced a new Bill to ban the use of wild animals in travelling circuses. The Wild Animals in Circuses Act 2019 came into effect on 20 January 2020.

Wales

A bill to ban the use of wild animals in travelling circuses in Wales was introduced in June 2019, and subsequently passed by the Welsh Parliament on 15 July 2020. Over 6,500 responses were made by the people of Wales, to the public consultation on the draft Bill, 97% of which supported the ban.

Scotland
The use of wild animals in travelling circuses has been banned in Scotland. The Wild Animals in Travelling Circuses (Scotland) Act 2018 came into force on 28 May 2018.

Worldwide

There are nationwide bans on using some if not all animals in circuses in Austria, Belgium, Bolivia, Bosnia and Herzegovina, Bulgaria, Colombia, Costa Rica, Croatia, Cyprus, Czech Republic, Denmark, Ecuador, El Salvador, Estonia, Finland, Greece, Hungary, India, Iran, Ireland, Israel, Italy, Malta, Mexico, Netherlands, Norway, Panama, Paraguay, Peru, Poland, Portugal, Singapore, Slovenia, Sweden, Switzerland, and Turkey. Germany, Spain, United Kingdom, Australia, Argentina, Chile, Brazil, Canada, and the United States have locally restricted or banned the use of animals in entertainment. In response to a growing popular concern about the use of animals in entertainment, animal-free circuses are becoming more common around the world. In 2009, Bolivia passed legislation banning the use of any animals, wild or domestic, in circuses. The law states that circuses "constitute an act of cruelty." Circus operators had one year from the bill's passage on 1 July 2009 to comply. In 2018 in Germany, an accident with an elephant during a circus performance, prompted calls to ban animal performances in circuses. PETA called the German politicians to outlaw the keeping of animals for circuses.

A survey confirmed that on average, wild animals spend around 99 to 91 percent of their time in cages, wagons, or enclosure due to transportation. This causes a huge amount of distress to animals and leads to excessive amounts of drooling.

City ordinances banning performances by wild animals have been enacted in San Francisco (2015), Los Angeles (2017), and New York City (2017).

Greece became the first European country to ban any animal from performing in any circus in its territory in February 2012, following a campaign by Animal Defenders International and the Greek Animal Welfare Fund (GAWF).

On 6 June 2015, the Federation of Veterinarians of Europe adopted a position paper in which it recommends the prohibition of the use of wild animals in travelling circuses.

Despite the contemporary circus' shift toward more theatrical techniques and its emphasis on human rather than animal performance, traditional circus companies still exist alongside the new movement. Numerous circuses continue to maintain animal performers, including UniverSoul Circus and the Big Apple Circus from the United States, Circus Krone from Munich, Circus Royale and Lennon Bros Circus from Australia, Vazquez Hermanos Circus, Circo Atayde Hermanos, and Hermanos Mayaror Circus from Mexico, and Moira Orfei Circus from Italy, to name just a few.

Buildings

In some towns, there are circus buildings where regular performances are held. The best known are:
 Blackpool Tower Circus
 Budapest Circus
 Circus Krone Building in Munich
 Cirque d'hiver, Paris
 Cirque Jules Verne in Amiens
 Hippodrome Circus, Great Yarmouth
 La Tohu in Montreal
 Moscow Circus on Tsvetnoy Boulevard in Moscow
 Shanghai Circus World in Shanghai
 Turkmen State Circus in Ashgabat
 Riga Circus in Riga
 Belarus State Circus in Minsk
 "Globus" Circus in Bucharest

In other countries, purpose-built circus buildings still exist which are no longer used as circuses, or are used for circus only occasionally among a wider programme of events; for example, the Cirkusbygningen (The Circus Building) in Copenhagen, Denmark, Cirkus in Stockholm, Sweden, or Carré Theatre in Amsterdam, Netherlands.

International awards
The International Circus Festival of Monte-Carlo has been held in Monaco since 1974 and was the first of many international awards for circus performers.

In art, music, films, plays and books

Erich Kästner's children's books  1963 (The Little Man) and  1967 (The Little Man and the Little Miss) are largely set in a circus where the orphaned young protagonist grows up as a ward of the show's magician.

The atmosphere of the circus has served as a dramatic setting for many musicians. The most famous circus theme song is called "Entrance of the Gladiators", and was composed in 1904 by Julius Fučík. Other circus music includes "El Caballero", "Quality Plus", "Sunnyland Waltzes", "The Storming of El Caney", "Pahjamah", "Bull Trombone", "Big Time Boogie", "Royal Bridesmaid March", "The Baby Elephant Walk", "Liberty Bell March", "Java", Strauss's "Radetsky March", and "Pageant of Progress". A poster for Pablo Fanque's Circus Royal, one of the most popular circuses of Victorian England, inspired John Lennon to write Being for the Benefit of Mr. Kite! on The Beatles' album, Sgt. Pepper's Lonely Hearts Club Band. The song title refers to William Kite, a well-known circus performer in the 19th century. Producer George Martin and EMI engineers created the song's fairground atmosphere by assembling a sound collage of collected recordings of calliopes and fairground organs, which they cut into strips of various lengths, threw into a box, and then mixed up and edited together randomly, creating a long loop which was mixed into the final production. Another traditional circus song is the John Philip Sousa march "Stars and Stripes Forever", which is played only to alert circus performers of an emergency.

Plays set in a circus include the 1896 musical The Circus Girl by Lionel Monckton, Polly of the Circus written in 1907 by Margaret Mayo, He Who Gets Slapped written by Russian Leonid Andreyev 1915 and later adapted into one of the first circus films, Katharina Knie written in 1928 by Carl Zuckmayer and adapted for the English stage in 1932 as Caravan by playwright Cecily Hamilton, the revue Big Top written by Herbert Farjeon in 1942, Top of the Ladder written by Tyrone Guthrie in 1950, Stop the World, I Want to Get Off written by Anthony Newley in 1961, and Barnum with music by Cy Coleman and lyrics and book by Mark Bramble, Roustabout: The Great Circus Train Wreck written by Jay Torrence in 2006.

Following World War I, circus films became popular. In 1924 He Who Gets Slapped was the first film released by MGM; in 1925 Sally of the Sawdust (remade 1930), Variety, and Vaudeville were produced, followed by The Devil's Circus in 1926 and The Circus starring Charlie Chaplin, Circus Rookies, 4 Devils; and Laugh Clown Laugh in 1928. German film Salto Mortale about trapeze artists was released in 1931 and remade in the United States and released as Trapeze starring Burt Lancaster in 1956; in 1932 Freaks was released; Charlie Chan at the Circus, Circus (USSR) and The Three Maxiums were released in 1936 and At the Circus starring the Marx Brothers and You Can't Cheat an Honest Man in 1939. Circus films continued to be popular during the Second World War; films from this era included The Great Profile starring John Barrymore (1940), the animated Disney film Dumbo (1941), Road Show (1941), The Wagons Roll at Night (1941) and Captive Wild Woman (1943).

Tromba, a film about a tiger trainer, was released in 1948. In 1952 Cecil B. de Mille's Oscar-winning film The Greatest Show on Earth was first shown. Released in 1953 were Man on a Tightrope and Ingmar Bergman's Gycklarnas afton (released as Sawdust and Tinsel in the United States); these were followed by Life Is a Circus; Ring of Fear; 3 Ring Circus (1954) and La Strada (1954), an Oscar-winning film by Federico Fellini about a girl who is sold to a circus strongman. Fellini made a second film set in the circus called The Clowns in 1970. Films about the circus made since 1959 include Disney's Toby Tyler (1960), the B-movie Circus of Horrors (also in 1960); the musical film Billy Rose's Jumbo (1962); A Tiger Walks, a Disney film about a tiger that escapes from the circus; and Circus World (1964), starring John Wayne. In Hanna-Barbera's first animated film Hey There, It's Yogi Bear! (1964), Cindy Bear is held captive in a circus where she is cruelly forced to perform until Yogi and Boo-Boo rescue her. Mera Naam Joker (1970), a Hindi drama film directed by Raj Kapoor which was about a clown who must make his audience laugh at the cost of his own sorrows. In the anime film Jungle Emperor Leo (1997), Leo's son Lune is captured and placed in a circus, which burns down when a tiger knocks down a ring of fire while jumping through it. The Greatest Showman, a musical film loosely based on the life of P. T. Barnum, was released in 2017.

The TV series Circus Humberto, based on the novel by Eduard Bass, follows the history of the circus family Humberto between 1826 and 1924. The setting of the HBO television series Carnivàle, which ran from 2003 to 2005, is also largely set in a travelling circus. The circus has also inspired many writers. Numerous books, both non-fiction and fiction, have been published about circus life. Notable examples of circus-based fiction include Circus Humberto by Eduard Bass, Cirque du Freak by Darren Shan, and Spangle by Gary Jennings. The novel Water for Elephants by Sara Gruen tells the fictional tale of a circus veterinarian and was made into a movie with the same title, starring Robert Pattinson and Reese Witherspoon. Science fiction writer Barry B. Longyear wrote a trilogy about a circus of the future: City of Baraboo; Elephant Song; and Circus World.

Circus is the central theme in comic books of Super Commando Dhruva, an Indian comic book superhero. According to this series, Dhruva was born and brought up in a fictional Indian circus called Jupiter Circus. When a rival circus burnt down Jupiter Circus, killing everyone in it, including Dhruva's parents, Dhruva vowed to become a crime fighter. A circus-based television series called Circus was also telecast in India in 1989 on DD National, starring Shahrukh Khan as the lead actor.

See also
Animal training
Chautauqua, tent shows that preceded American circus
Circus clown
Clown alley
Circus skills
Cirque du Soleil
Clown
Contemporary circus
Dog and pony show
Flea circus
History of Indian circus
International Circus Festival of Monte-Carlo
Traveling carnival
Lion taming
List of circuses and circus owners

Notes

References

Further reading

Assael, Brenda, "Circus and Victorian Society", 2005, University of Virginia Press, Charlottesville 

 Childress, Micah D. Circus Life: Performing and Laboring Under America's Big Top Shows, 1830-1920 (University of Tennessee Press, 2018), p. 247 online review.
 Provides an overview of "low-yield research" into the history of the American Circus as covered in "ragcontent newspapers [and] magazines [such as] White Tops"
Johnson, William M. 1990. The Rose-Tinted Menagerie. Iridescent Publishing
Nance, Susan. Entertaining Elephants: Animal Agency and the Business of the American Circus (Johns Hopkins University Press; 2013) 304 pages; elephants as "actors" or creatures of agency in the American circus from 1800 to 1940.
 Simon, Linda. The Greatest Shows on Earth: A History of the Circus (Reaktion Books, distributed by University of Chicago Press; 2014); 296 pages;

External links

 
Dictionary of Circus Slang (American and British/European)
History of American Circuses and Sideshows
Circopedia
National Museum of Performing Arts, Theatre Museum. Circus Guided Tour
The Philip Astley Project

 
Circus
Animal keeping by humans
Articles containing video clips